The Karamea River is a river of New Zealand. It is located in the Tasman and West Coast Regions of the South Island. The river rises within Kahurangi National Park in the Matiri Range of the Southern Alps. The river rises to the east of Mount Allen, meandering west briefly before turning north. After some 25 kilometres it again turns west,  to enter a series of small lakes where its waters are joined by those of the Roaring Lion River.

From here the river continues west through steep-sided valleys before leaving the national park and reaching its floodplain 10 kilometres from the coast of the Tasman Sea. The river passes the small settlements of Umere and Arapito before reaching the Ōtūmahana Estuary and the Tasman Sea close to the township of Karamea.

Flood risk 
There is a history of flooding from the Karamea River. In 1899, a large flood swept away a new bridge across the river and caused damage to settlers homes, farms and crops. Another major flood caused serious damage in January 1915, inundating the main street and the majority of houses.

Deposits of silt raised the level of the river bed and led to a greatly increased risk of flooding in the townships of Karamea and Market Cross. On 30 December 1929 there was heavy damage in Karamea and Arapito from a sudden flood attributed to the breach of a dam created during the earthquake. In April 1931, floodwaters entered most of the homes around Market Cross, and some in the Karamea township. In August 1931, the settlers were given access to relief funding from the West Coast Earthquake Relief Fund for the damage caused by these floods.

Over the next few years, stop banks and training walls were constructed on the north side of the river to help mitigate the flood risk to the town. In May 1936 the Karamea School Committee notified the Education Board of their concerns about the damage caused by repeated flooding of the school. Relocation to a new site was proposed.  In October 1936 there was a further major flood that entered 40 houses in Karamea and Market Cross.  In September 1937, a large flood led to the river breaking through to the sea at the location of the old river mouth, cutting a new channel that greatly reduced the flood risk to the town and enabled the entry of vessels at high tide. Further river protection works were installed between 1938 and 1940, and these successfully defended the township during a heavy flood in the river in February 1940.

Between 2008 and 2010, the two openings merged at a location giving a direct exit to the sea for the Karamea River. From December 2010, the combined opening migrated south. This new location increases the risk of flooding in some areas of Karamea. A report to the West Coast Regional Council in 2016 recommended mechanical excavation of a breach channel to allow the next major flood to cut a new direct route to the sea, and mitigate the flood risk.

See also
List of rivers of New Zealand

References

Rivers of the West Coast, New Zealand
Buller District
Kahurangi National Park
Rivers of New Zealand
Karamea